Sain may refer to:

People 
 Bhagat Sain (14th and 15th centuries), king of Rewa, disciple of Bhagat Ramanand
 Édouard Alexandre Sain (1830–1910), a French painter
 Isidoro Sain (1869–1932), Bishop of the Roman Catholic Church
 Johnny Sain (1917–2006), American baseball player 
 Oliver Sain (1932–2003), American musician and record producer
 Orlando Sain (1912–1995), Italian footballer
 Pappu Sain (c. 1962–2021), Pakistani dhol player
 Paul Saïn (1853-1908), French painter
 Sain Zahoor (born c. 1937), Pakistani Sufi musician

Fictional Characters
 Sain, a character from the video game Fire Emblem: The Blazing Blade

Places 
 Sain, Ardabil, a village in Iran
 Sain, Sareyn, a village in Iran
 Sain, Zanjan, a village in Iran
 Sain Rural District, in East Azerbaijan Province, Iran

Other uses 
 Sain (record label), Welsh record label
 Sain (magazine), Australian music magazine
 Sain (Sen caste), an occupational caste in northern India
 SAIN, the Sustainable Agriculture Innovation Network, UK-Chinese initiative

See also 
 Saine, a surname (including a list of persons with the name)
 Sane (disambiguation)
 Sayn, a small German county of the Holy Roman Empire